Nagrakata Railway Station serves the village of Nagrakata in Doars region of Jalpaiguri district of the Indian state of West Bengal. The station lies on New Jalpaiguri–Alipurduar–Samuktala Road line of Northeast Frontier Railway, Alipurduar railway station.

References

Railway stations in West Bengal
Alipurduar railway division